"Reasons for Living" is the third and final single from the debut album of American singer-songwriter Duncan Sheik.

Details
While the album version of the song did not fare well on the radio, the club remixes helped the single reach number three on the Billboard Hot Dance Club Play chart.

Track listing
"Reasons for Living" (Johnny Vicious Mix) - 11:01
"Reasons for Living" (PQM's Bootleg Revisited Mix) - 6:09
"Reasons for Living" (La Leche Mix) - 3:43
"Reasons for Living" (Madamix) - 7:45
"Reasons for Living" (Vicious Groove-A-Pella) - 3:20
"Reasons for Living" (LP Mix) - 4:30

Chart performance

References

Duncan Sheik songs
1997 singles
1996 songs
Songs written by Duncan Sheik
Song recordings produced by Rupert Hine
Atlantic Records singles